Vitamin She is a 2020 Indian Telugu-language Comedy drama film written and directed by V. Jayashankarr who made his debut directional with Paper Boy Movie and produced by Ravi Kumar Polishetty under the banner Full Moon Media Production. The film features Srikanth Gurram and Prachi Thaker in lead roles with Ranjit Reddy and Sanjeev Joshi in pivotal roles. Music composed by P.V.R. Raja. Movie was filmed during the lockdown and released on MX Player and Amazon Prime Video.

Plot 
Software Engineer Leo alias Lingababu Yoganandam is a smart phone addicted person. Also, while spending time with his cell phone, he spends the rest of his time in love with a girl named Vaidhehi who works in the same company. He is wondering how to express his love to that girl. In this way his phone will be lost and a new phone will be bought. But the moment the new phone comes into his hands, his life takes a turn.

Cast 
 Srikanth Gurram as Leo
 Prachi Thaker as Vaidhehi

Soundtrack 

Music composed by P.V.R. Raja

Release
The film was released on 29 December 2020.

Critical reception 
The film received 2.75 stars out of five in a review by The Hans india
and 3 stars out of five in a review by The Times Of India telugu.samayam.com.

References

External links

2020s Telugu-language films